Robert Geoffrey Burrow  (born 26 September 1982) is an English former professional rugby league player. An England and Great Britain representative, he spent his entire 16-year professional career with Leeds Rhinos in the Super League, making over 400 appearances between 2001 and 2017. Despite this, he was one of the most successful players in the competition's history, winning eight Super League championships, two Challenge Cups, being named to the Super League Dream Team on three occasions and winning the Harry Sunderland Trophy twice.

On 19 December 2019, Burrow revealed that he had been diagnosed with Motor Neuron Disease (MND). On 30 December 2020, he was appointed MBE in the 2021 New Years Honours List for his services to Rugby League and the Motor Neuron Disease community.

Playing career

2000s
Burrow played for the Leeds Rhinos from the interchange bench in their 2004 Super League Grand Final victory against the Bradford Bulls. As Super League IX champions, the Rhinos faced 2004 NRL season premiers, the Bulldogs in the 2005 World Club Challenge. Burrow played from the interchange bench, scoring a try in Leeds' 39–32 victory. He played for Leeds in the 2005 Challenge Cup Final at scrum half back in their loss against Hull FC. Later that year he played for the Leeds Rhinos at stand-off half back in their 2005 Super League Grand Final loss against Bradford Bulls.

In June 2007, Burrow was called up to the Great Britain squad for the Test match against France. He was named as Leeds Rhinos Player of the Year for his performance throughout the 2007 season, and was named in the Super League Dream Team for the same year along with teammates Scott Donald, Jamie Peacock and Gareth Ellis. He was the winner of the Harry Sunderland Award for a man of the match performance in 2007's Super League XII Grand Final, in which Leeds defeated St. Helens by 33 points to 6. He played a pivotal role in helping Great Britain to a 3–0 victory over New Zealand in the Gillette Fusion Test series in 2007. He was awarded the George Smith Medal as player of the series which he finished as top points scorer with 26 from two tries and nine goals.

Burrow was named in the Super League Dream Team for 2008's Super League XIII season. He played in the 2008 Super League Grand Final victory over St. Helens.

Burrow was selected for the England squad to compete in the 2008 Rugby League World Cup tournament in Australia. In the first Group A match against Papua New Guinea, he played at scrum half back, with England winning the game.

He played in the 2009 Super League Grand Final victory over St. Helens at Old Trafford.

2010s
Burrow played in five Challenge Cup Finals in six years between 2010 and 2015, with Leeds Rhinos losing in three consecutive finals in 2010, 2011, and 2012. The team then won successive finals in 2014. and 2015.

Burrow also played in the 2011 Super League Grand Final victory over St. Helens, following which he became the first player to win the Harry Sunderland Award twice by winning the unanimous votes of all 37 judges. He also played in the 2012 Super League Grand Final victory over the Warrington Wolves, and the 2015 Super League Grand Final victory over the Wigan Warriors.

He was not selected for England's post-season 2011 Four Nations campaign due to a rib injury.

Burrow announced his retirement in 2017. His final match was the 2017 Super League Grand Final in which he helped his club, Leeds to victory over the Castleford Tigers at Old Trafford.

Honours

Club
 Super League (8): 2004, 2007, 2008, 2009, 2011, 2012, 2015, 2017
 Challenge Cup (2): 2014, 2015
 World Club Challenge (3): 2005, 2008, 2012
 League Leader's Shield (3): 2004, 2009, 2015

Individual
 Harry Sunderland Trophy: 2007, 2011

Hall of Fame
Burrow became the sixteenth inductee to the Leeds Rhinos Hall of Fame in 2020.

Academic awards

On 16 March 2021 Burrow was awarded the Honorary degree of Doctor of Sport Science by Leeds Beckett University.

Queen's New Year Honours List

SPOTY/Helen Rollason Award

At the 2022 BBC Sports Personality of the Year Award, Burrow was awarded the Helen Rollason award, for "raising awareness of/and fundraising", for Motor Neurone Disease.

Kevin Sinfield was also awarded the Panel Special award, for his remarkable fundraising for research and support for Motor Neurone Disease.

Personal life 

Burrow is the son of Geoff and husband of Lindsey, with whom he has two daughters and a son. His autobiography Too Many Reasons to Live was published in 2021.

References

External links

Profile at Rugby League Record Keepers' Club
 (archived by web.archive.org) Leeds Rhinos profile

1982 births
Living people
England national rugby league team players
English rugby league players
Great Britain national rugby league team players
Leeds Rhinos players
Members of the Order of the British Empire
People with motor neuron disease
Rugby league halfbacks
Rugby league hookers
Rugby league players from Pontefract
Yorkshire rugby league team players